The New Scene of King Curtis is an album by saxophonist King Curtis recorded for the New Jazz label in 1960. The album features Nat Adderley who performed under the pseudonym "Little Brother" on the original release due to contractual restrictions.

Reception

Eugene Chadbourne's review on AllMusic states: "for the 1960 recording, Curtis is accompanied by two-thirds of a famous Miles Davis rhythm section as well as a drummer who eventually became prominent on the Parisian swing scene ... Chambers and Kelly can not be too strongly emphasized as components of this brilliant group, carrying over their assets to the Curtis session as if shifting boxes from one side of a garage to another".

Track listing
All compositions by King Curtis except where noted
 "Da-Duh-Dah" – 5:11
 "Have You Heard?" (Curtis, Herman Foster) – 10:23
 "Willow Weep for Me" (Ann Ronell) – 5:24
 "Little Brother Soul" – 8:35
 "In a Funky Groove" – 10:49

Personnel

Performance
King Curtis – tenor saxophone 
Little Brother – trumpet (tracks 1-3 & 5)
Wynton Kelly – piano
Paul Chambers – bass
Oliver Jackson – drums

Production
 The Sound of America – producer
 Rudy Van Gelder – engineer

References

King Curtis albums
1960 albums
New Jazz Records albums
Albums recorded at Van Gelder Studio